The 2017 Campeonato Baiano is the 113th edition of Bahia's top football league. Vitória won the tournament for the 29th time and second straight time against Bahia, on away goals, after a 1–1 draw on aggregate.

Format
First Round
The eleven teams each play each other once, for a total of 10 games.
The top four teams go on to the Semi-Finals.
The bottom two teams are relegated to the Campeonato Baiano 2° Divisão.
Final Rounds
The four advancing teams are paired according to their record:
1st vs. 4th
2nd vs. 3rd
The matches are played over two legs, on aggregate.
The better of the two playing teams hosts the second leg.
The two winners go on to the final, also decided over two legs.
The better team, over both the first round and the Semi-Finals, hosts the second leg.
Qualification
The top three teams not already playing in Série A, Série B, or Série C, or already assured qualification to Série D qualify for the 2018 Campeonato Brasileiro Série D
The winner and runner-up, and fourth place qualify for the 2018 Copa do Brasil.
The winner, runner-up, and third place qualify for the 2018 Copa do Nordeste.

Teams

First round

Final rounds

Semi-finals

Vitória win 6–1 on Aggregate.

Bahia win 4–0 on Aggregate.

Final

Vitória win 1–1 on away goals

Fluminense de Feira, Vitória da Conquista, and Jaciupense qualify for the Série D.Vitória, Bahia, and Vitória da Conquista qualify for the 2018 Copa do Brasil.Vitória, Bahia, and Fluminense de Feira qualify for the 2018 Copa do Nordeste.

Topscorers

References

2017 in Brazilian football
Campeonato Baiano